Harold Sullivan McDevitt (June 5, 1885– ?) was an American college football and baseball coach. He served as the head football coach at the Catholic University of America in 1912 and Colgate University in 1917. He coached baseball at Colby College. McDevitt played as a quarterback at Dartmouth College in 1906, where he also later served as an assistant football coach.

Biography
McDevitt was born on June 5, 1885 in Boston, and attended Brighton High School. He then went on to Dartmouth College, where he played baseball from 1905 to 1907 and as a reserve quarterback on the 1906 football team. He was also a member of the Theta Delta Chi fraternity and the College Glee Club. McDevitt graduated in 1907. The following year, he was an assistant coach for the football team.

In 1909, he coached the baseball team at Colby College in Waterville, Maine. That fall, he was hired as the head coach at Newton High School in Newton, Massachusetts. In 1910, McDevitt again returned to his alma mater to mentor the quarterbacks. In 1911, he served as the coach at Colby College.

In 1912, McDevitt served as the head coach at the Catholic University of America and compiled a 3–5 record. The following year, he returned to Massachusetts as the coach at Salem High School, where he was charged with rebuilding the team. In 1915, McDevitt coach English High School in Lynn, Massachusetts. In September 1917, Colgate University hired McDevitt as its 18th head football coach to replace E.C. Huntington who had joined the U.S. Army. He held that post for one season and amassed a 4–2 record.

References

1885 births
Year of death missing
Catholic University Cardinals football coaches
Colby Mules baseball coaches
Colby Mules football coaches
Colby College faculty
Colgate Raiders football coaches
Dartmouth Big Green football players
Dartmouth Big Green football coaches
High school football coaches in Massachusetts
Sportspeople from Boston
Players of American football from Boston
Brighton High School (Brighton, Massachusetts) alumni